Georg Heiß (25 April 1897 – 4 December 1916) was an Austrian footballer. He played in one match for the Austria national football team in 1914.

References

External links
 

1897 births
1916 deaths
Austrian footballers
Austria international footballers
Place of birth missing
Association footballers not categorized by position